Amadou Makhtar N'Diayé (born 31 December 1981) is a Senegalese former professional footballer who played as a midfielder.

He made fourteen appearances for his country at international level in 2002, notably participating in the 2002 FIFA World Cup.

Career
N'Diayé was initially on trial at Scottish Premier League club Rangers, managed by his former Rennes boss Paul Le Guen, throughout the summer of 2006, and joined them on their tour of South Africa, before being signed to a one-year contract after impressing. N'Diaye has been capped 14 times for his country and played at the highest level. N'Diaye also had an unsuccessful trial with Grimsby Town in 2005.

N'Diayé left Rangers at the end of the 2006–07 season after failing to win a new contract. He did not play a single match under new boss Walter Smith. He has previously played for Stade Rennais and CS Sedan Ardennes in France and Yverdon-Sport FC in Switzerland.

Dundee took N'Diayé on as a trialist in the summer of 2008 during a pre-season tour of England. However, they dropped their interest in the player after he broke his arm in a game against Bradford City.

References

External links
 
 
 

1981 births
Living people
Footballers from Dakar
Association football midfielders
Senegalese footballers
Senegal international footballers
2002 FIFA World Cup players
Stade Rennais F.C. players
CS Sedan Ardennes players
Yverdon-Sport FC players
Rangers F.C. players
Scottish Premier League players
Ligue 1 players
Senegalese expatriate footballers
Senegalese expatriate sportspeople in Scotland
Expatriate footballers in Scotland
Senegalese expatriate sportspeople in Switzerland
Expatriate footballers in Switzerland
Senegalese expatriate sportspeople in France
Expatriate footballers in France
2002 African Cup of Nations players